The Former Residence of Zeng Guofan or Zeng Guofan's Former Residence was built in 1865. It is located in Heye Town, Shuangfeng County, Hunan, China. It includes the Banyue Pool, gatehouse, main buildings, Qiuque Pavilion, Guipu Pavilion, Yifang Hall, and Siyun Hall, of which Siyun Hall was built by Zeng Guofan himself in 1857.

History
The house was built in 1865, in the 4th year of Tongzhi period (1862–1875) in the Qing dynasty (1644–1911).

In 1996, it has been designated as a provincial key cultural unit.

In 2006, it is listed among the six batch of "Major National Historical and Cultural Sites" by the State Council of China.

Gallery

References

External links

Major National Historical and Cultural Sites in Hunan
Buildings and structures in Loudi
Traditional folk houses in Hunan
Tourist attractions in Loudi
Zeng Guofan